Nonscience is a 1971 book which claims to have the longest and most complex title in publishing history.

The book was updated and reissued in 2020 as Nonscience Returns by the Curtis Press.

Its author Brian J. Ford pokes fun at those who conceal their lack of real expertise by using long and complicated words, whilst making the serious point that many people are fooled by these so-called experts. Some consider the book prescient, thinking that modern society, where decisions are taken by unseen experts, is much as Ford predicted.

Spanish edition
In the Spanish edition the title was rendered as  [translation by Oscar Muslera], Libertad y Cambio, Buenos Aires: Granica Editor.

Reviews
In Britain, the book was reviewed in the following publications:
The Times Higher Educational Supplement, October 22, 1971
Atticus Column, Sunday Times, October 24, 1971
Irish Press, October 30, 1971
Time Out magazine, November 12, 1971.
New Statesman, November 12, 1971.
Nature: 234, December 3, 1971
The Times Educational Supplement, December 3, 1971
Times Literary Supplement, January 21, 1972
Mensa Journal, January 22, 1972

The book was also featured on the BBC television show Tomorrow's World.

See also
 Fashionable Nonsense: Postmodern Intellectuals' Abuse of Science

References

External links
The author's website page on this book

1971 non-fiction books